Aq Divar (also Romanized as Āq Dīvār; also known as Āghdīvār) is a village in Shaban Rural District, in the Central District of Meshgin Shahr County, Ardabil Province, Iran. At the 2006 census, its population was 35, in 8 families.

References 

Towns and villages in Meshgin Shahr County